CPCP may refer to:

 Soviet Union
 College Point Corporate Park, an industrial park in College Point, Queens, New York City
 Carnivore and Pangolin Conservation Program, at Cúc Phương National Park
 Council of Presbyterian Churches in the Philippines, of the Presbyterian Church of the Philippines

See also
 CP (disambiguation)
 CP2 (disambiguation)